Georg Müller (23 February 1880 – 13 July 1952) was a German sculptor. His work was part of the sculpture event in the art competition at the 1936 Summer Olympics.

References

1880 births
1952 deaths
20th-century German sculptors
20th-century German male artists
German male sculptors
Olympic competitors in art competitions
Artists from Munich